Madiyal  is a village in the northern  state of Karnataka, India. It is located in the Aland taluk of Kalaburagi in Karnataka.

Demographics
 India census, Madiyal had a population of 5799 with 2920 males and 2879 females.

See also
 Kalaburagi
 Districts of Karnataka

References

External links
 http://Gulbarga.nic.in/

Villages in Kalaburagi district